Jean Pichette (born 19 July 1963) is a Canadian speed skater. He competed at the 1984 Winter Olympics and the 1988 Winter Olympics.

References

External links
 

1963 births
Living people
Canadian male speed skaters
Olympic speed skaters of Canada
Speed skaters at the 1984 Winter Olympics
Speed skaters at the 1988 Winter Olympics
People from Lévis, Quebec
Sportspeople from Quebec
20th-century Canadian people